Karaj Metro Station is a station in Tehran Metro Line 5. It is located in southeastern Karaj near Tehran-Qazvin Freeway. It is between Atmosfer Metro Station and Mahdasht Metro Station.

References

Tehran Metro stations